Terrence La'Mar Austin (born August 25, 1988) is a former American football wide receiver. He was selected by Washington Redskins in the seventh round of the 2010 NFL Draft. He played college football at University of California, Los Angeles (UCLA).

Professional career

Washington Redskins
Austin was drafted by the Washington Redskins in the seventh round of the 2010 NFL Draft. He was released by the team on September 4, 2010, and was signed to the practice squad the next day. He was promoted to the active roster on November 27, 2010.
Austin had his first NFL catch against Jacksonville on Week 16. At the end of 2010 NFL season, Austin played a total of 5 games.

At the beginning of the 2011 season, Austin made the active 53-man roster.
Austin played a total of 13 games by the end of the season. Contributing more to special teams, he recorded 12 receptions and 137 receiving yards.

At the start of 2012 training camp, it was announced that Austin was taking reps as punt returner providing competition for Brandon Banks. Austin was released on August 31, 2012 for final cuts before the start of the 2012 season.

Detroit Lions
Austin signed a futures contract with the Detroit Lions on January 1, 2013. He was released on August 27, 2013.

Los Angeles Kiss
Austin was assigned to the Los Angeles Kiss of the Arena Football League (AFL) on May 31, 2014.

Children: Trinity Austin

References

External links
Washington Redskins bio
UCLA Bruins bio

1988 births
Living people
Players of American football from Long Beach, California
American football wide receivers
UCLA Bruins football players
Washington Redskins players
Detroit Lions players
Los Angeles Kiss players
Long Beach Polytechnic High School alumni